Maldhan chaur is situated 19 km from Ramnagar and 23 km from Kashipur, having an area of around 15 to 20 villages in Ramnagar Block in 'Nainital' District of Uttarakhand, also called 'Devbhumi'. It has more than 20,000 of population, most of the population belongs to the Kumauni and Garhwali communities. The literacy rate is moderate. Most of the employed people work for government sector or near by Companies. The primary languages are Pahari, Garwali, Hindi and English. Here is very famous dam named as 'Tumariya Dam' which is used for irrigation of crops and for fishing and also a Tourist Attaraction.

How to Reach 
Maldhan is connected to Ramnagar, Kashipur and Jaspur by road and can be reached by Bus and Tempo. Nearest railway station is Gaushala (7 km apart)
and Kashipur is the nearest junction.

Sub Villages in Maldhan 
Maldhan was set up by Shri Khusi Ram ji, for residents of Uttarakhand belonging to Hilly region, here is an Inter College (Senior Secondary School) named as Khushi Ram Inter College and an ITI having 3 branches Electrical, Fitter, COPA. Maldhan consists villages like Chandra Nagar as No.1, Adarsh nagar as No.2, Gautam nagar as No.5, Devipura as no.4, Purani Basti, Nayi Basti, Kumugadar, Patrani etc. This village is surrounded by Garhinegi and Hathidangar.

CM Harish Rawat gave a promise to make a Degree College in Maldhan chour, now it is temporary functioning at ITI.  Many students studying in good colleges/schools like some in Haldwani (MBBS), Govt. Polytecnic Kashipur, Army Public School Hempur, Pioneer's Academy etc.

Overall it's a good area for living, land prices are also cheap compared to nearby areas.

Villages in Nainital district
Hill stations in Uttarakhand